St. Flavian II of Antioch (Phlabianós II Antiokheías) was the Patriarch of Antioch from 498 until his deposition in 512.

Biography
Flavian was a Monk under the Rule of St Basil at the Monastery of Tilmognon and later became an apocrisiarius. After the death of Palladius in 498, Flavian was appointed by Emperor Anastasius I as Patriarch of Antioch on the condition that he accepted the Henotikon. However, during his reign as patriarch, Flavian did not show any opposition to Chalcedonianism.

As patriarch, Flavian and Patriarch Elias of Jerusalem, resisted the attempts to abolish the Council of Chalcedon. However, due to the conflict between Chalcedonians and non-Chalcedonians in Antioch, Flavian endeavoured to please both parties by steering a middle course in reference to the Chalcedonian decrees, yet was forced by Anastasius to sign the Henotikon in 508/509. Furthermore, Flavian was accused of Nestorianism by Philoxenus, Bishop of Hierapolis.

In 511, Philoxenus convinced Monophysites of the surrounding Syrian countryside to storm Antioch and force Flavian to condemn the Council of Chalcedon but was met by fierce Chalcedonians who slaughtered the attackers and dumped their bodies into the River Orontes. The monks of Flavian's former monastery journeyed to Antioch to defend Flavian against the anti-Chalcedonians. These events drove Anastasius to adopt a Miaphysite ecclesiastical programme and thus Flavian and Elias lost imperial support.

A synod was convened in Sidon in 512 by Philoxenus and eighty other non-Chalcedonian bishops, with the support of Anastasius, to condemn Flavian and Elias and as a result he was deposed and banished to Petra, where he died in 518. Flavian's deposition and subsequent resentment towards Anastasius caused Vitalian's rebellion in 513. Flavian was soon posthumously enrolled among the saints of the Eastern Church, and after some opposition, in the Western Church as well.

References

Sources 
 

5th-century births
518 deaths
Patriarchs of Antioch
Syrian Christian saints
Syrian archbishops
5th-century archbishops
6th-century archbishops
5th-century Christian saints
6th-century Christian saints